St. Peter Cathedral is a Chaldean Catholic cathedral located in El Cajon, California, United States.  It is the seat for the Eparchy of St. Peter the Apostle.

History
The first Chaldean Catholic Assyrian people to immigrate to the United States arrived at the end of the nineteenth century. Although small in number, they were spread across the country by the middle of the twentieth century. St. Peter Chaldean Catholic parish was established in 1973 with Father Peter Kattoula as its first pastor.

The present church building was completed in 1983 and dedicated on September 10 of that year. It has a seating capacity of 600 people. The church hall was opened on November 29, 1989. It became a cathedral when the Eparchy of St. Peter the Apostle was established in 2002.

In September 2020 the cathedral was vandalized with graffiti of contradictory messages including among other things pentagrams, upside down crosses, white power, swastikas, "BLM", and "Biden 2020".

See also
List of Catholic cathedrals in the United States
List of cathedrals in the United States

References

External links
 Diocesan website

Christian organizations established in 1973
Churches completed in 1983
Assyrian-American culture in California
Eastern Catholic churches in California
Chaldean Catholic cathedrals in the United States
Churches in San Diego County, California
El Cajon, California
Byzantine Revival architecture in California
Eastern Catholic cathedrals in California